Steven Ehrichs Colón (born September 11, 1989) is a retired footballer who played as a defender or midfielder.

A native of Brentwood, New York, Ehrichs graduated from Brentwood High School. He played four years of college soccer at Hofstra, scoring four goals in 66 appearances for the Pride. After college, he appeared for three seasons in the Long Island Soccer Football League (LISFL), playing with Mineola Portuguese and Port Jefferson SC. Ehrichs represented Puerto Rico at the international level, earning three caps for the senior side including starting in two 2010 World Cup Qualifying matches against Honduras. He also played in a 2010 Caribbean Cup qualification match against Cayman Islands.

References

External links
 
 
 

1989 births
Living people
Puerto Rican footballers
Soccer players from New York (state)
People from Brentwood, New York
Association football utility players
Hofstra Pride men's soccer players
Puerto Rico youth international footballers
Puerto Rico international footballers